Hoveton  is a village and civil parish in the English county of Norfolk. It is located within the Norfolk Broads, and immediately across the River Bure from the village of Wroxham. Whilst Hoveton is north of the river, Wroxham is south; but many people refer to the whole settlement as "Wroxham".

The villages name origin is uncertain 'Hofa's farm/settlement' or perhaps, 'ale-hoof farm/settlement'. Ale-hoof is probably ground-ivy (glechoma hederacea)

Administration
The civil parish has an area of 10.2 km2 and in the 2001 census had a population of 1,804 in 873 households, the population decreasing to 1759 at the 2011 Census. For the purposes of local government, the parish falls within the district of North Norfolk.

Governance
An electoral ward in the same name exists. This ward had a population of 1,948 at the 2011 Census.

Transport
Hoveton is served by Hoveton and Wroxham railway station, which is on the Bittern Line from Norwich to Cromer and Sheringham, and which is adjacent to the terminus of the narrow-gauge Bure Valley Railway to Aylsham. The station was originally intended to be on the Wroxham side of the river, but a change of plan resulted in it being sited in Hoveton; however, it was misleadingly named "Wroxham Station" for many years. It was renamed "Hoveton and Wroxham" in the mid-1960s. Locals and regular visitors still refer to it by its old name, which can lead to confusion when purchasing a ticket in other parts of the country, and can result in being sold a ticket to Wrexham, North Wales.

Local facilities
Hoveton has two churches, St Peter and St John.

Roys of Wroxham, dubbed the world's largest village store, was founded in Coltishall by Alfred Roy in 1895, with a second store opening in Hoveton in 1899. Roys includes a department store, a supermarket, a garden centre, a toy shop & a DIY store in Hoveton with a petrol station in Wroxham and many other department stores & supermarkets across Norfolk & Suffolk.

Bouchon Wine Bar is a French-styled wine bar which encompasses a Wine Merchant, Bar, Restaurant and Deli. It is extremely popular for locals and tourists alike and serves rustic French food and tapas as well as having over 100 wines available by the bottle and glass.

Hoveton has a high school, Broadland High Ormiston Academy.

Hoveton Old Hall dates from 1567, and features a Queen Anne style 17th century wing.

Hoveton Hall is a 19th-century building attributed to Humphry Repton. Although the house is not open to the public, its gardens are a popular tourist attraction. Hoveton Great Broad and Hoveton Little Broad carry the village's name.

Hoveton has tourist shops, pubs, cafes and a gift shop.

Notable people
Anthony Aufrère (1757–1833), barrister and translator
Henry Blofeld (b. 1939), cricket commentator
Sir John Blofeld (b. 1932), judge
Tom Blofeld (b. 1964), writer
Alan Hunter (1922–2005), writer
Louise Jermy (1877–1952), servant, was encourage by the local WI to publish her autobiography

Famous connections
The Norfolk landscape painter John Crome, an associate of John Sell Cotman and others of the Norwich school, made an etching of Hoveton in 1812.

Notes 

http://kepn.nottingham.ac.uk/map/place/Norfolk/Hoveton%20St.%20John%20and%20St.%20Peter

External links

.

Villages in Norfolk
North Norfolk
Civil parishes in Norfolk
People from Hoveton